Ahmed Nabawy  is an Egyptian information activist, winner of the 2015 DDX award in Istanbul, Turkey, winner of an award through the Munathara Initiative in Jordan, founder on TEDxMinyaElQamh, builder of the CareoMeter system that helps employees to check their own KPI's live through mobile application, and a 2012 nominee for the international TED prize in Doha.

Awards 
 DDX2 Award (2015)
 TED prize Nominee (2012)

References

External links 
 Ahmed Nabawy Website

1987 births
Living people
Egyptian activists
Zagazig University alumni